Nationality is a legal identification of a person in international law, establishing the person as a subject, a national, of a sovereign state. It affords the state jurisdiction over the person and affords the person the protection of the state against other states.

Article 15 of the Universal Declaration of Human Rights states that "Everyone has the right to a nationality", and "No one shall be arbitrarily deprived of his nationality nor denied the right to change his nationality". By international custom and conventions, it is the right of each state to determine who its nationals are. Such determinations are part of nationality law. In some cases, determinations of nationality are also governed by public international law—for example, by treaties on statelessness and the European Convention on Nationality.

The rights and duties of nationals vary from state to state, and are often complemented by citizenship law, in some contexts to the point where citizenship is synonymous with nationality. However, nationality differs technically and legally from citizenship, which is a different legal relationship between a person and a country. The noun "national" can include both citizens and non-citizens. The most common distinguishing feature of citizenship is that citizens have the right to participate in the political life of the state, such as by voting or standing for election. However, in most modern countries all nationals are citizens of the state, and full citizens are always nationals of the state.

In older texts or other languages the word "nationality", rather than "ethnicity", is often used to refer to an ethnic group (a group of people who share a common ethnic identity, language, culture, lineage, history, and so forth). This older meaning of "nationality" is not defined by political borders or passport ownership and includes nations that lack an independent state (such as the Arameans, Scots, Welsh, English, Andalusians, Basques, Catalans, Kurds, Kabyles, Baluchs, Hindkowans, Pashtuns, Multanis, Sindhis, Berbers, Bosniaks, Palestinians, Hmong, Inuit, Copts, Māori, Wakhis, Xhosas and Zulus, among others). Individuals may also be considered nationals of groups with autonomous status that have ceded some power to a larger sovereign state.

Nationality is also employed as a term for national identity, with some cases of identity politics and nationalism conflating the legal nationality as well as ethnicity with a national identity.

International law 
Nationality is the status that allows a nation to grant rights to the subject and to impose obligations upon the subject. In most cases, no rights or obligations are automatically attached to this status, although the status is a necessary precondition for any rights and obligations created by the state.

In European law, nationality is the status or relationship that gives the nation the right to protect a person from other nations. Diplomatic and consular protection are dependent upon this relationship between the person and the state. A person's status as being the national of a country is used to resolve the conflict of laws.

Within the broad limits imposed by a few treaties and international law, states may freely define who are and are not their nationals. However, since the Nottebohm case, other states are only required to respect the claim(s) by a state to protect an alleged national if the nationality is based on a true social bond. In the case of dual nationality, the states may determine the most effective nationality for the person, to determine which state's laws are the most relevant. There are also limits on removing a person's status as a national. Article 15 of the Universal Declaration of Human Rights states that "Everyone has the right to a nationality," and "No one shall be arbitrarily deprived of his nationality nor denied the right to change his nationality."

Legal protections 
The following instruments address the right to a nationality:

 Convention Relating to the Status of Refugees 
Protocol Relating to the Status of Refugees
 Convention Relating to the Status of Stateless Persons
 Convention on the Reduction of Statelessness
 European Convention on Nationality
 African Charter on the Rights and Welfare of the Child (art. 6) 
 American Convention on Human Rights (art. 20)
 American Declaration of the Rights and Duties of Man (art. 19)
 Arab Charter on Human Rights (art. 24)
 Convention on the Elimination of All Forms of Discrimination Against Women (art. 9)
 International Convention on the Elimination of All Forms of Racial Discrimination (art. 5(d)(iii))
 Convention on the Rights of Persons with Disabilities (art. 18)
 Convention on the Rights of the Child (arts. 7 and 8)
 Council of Europe Convention on the Avoidance of Statelessness in Relation to State Succession
 International Covenant on Civil and Political Rights (art. 24(3))
 Protocol to the African Charter on Human and Peoples’ Rights on the Rights of Women in Africa (Maputo Protocol) (art. 6(g) and (h))
 Universal Declaration of Human Rights (art. 15)

National law 
Nationals normally have the right to enter or return to the country they belong to. Passports are issued to nationals of a state, rather than only to citizens, because passport is a travel document used to enter the country. However, nationals may not have the right of abode (the right to live permanently) in the countries that granted them passports.

Nationality versus citizenship 

Conceptually, citizenship is focused on the internal political life of the state and nationality is a matter of international law. Article 15 of the Universal Declaration of Human Rights states that everyone has the right to nationality. As such nationality in international law can be called and understood as citizenship, or more generally as subject or belonging to a sovereign state, and not as ethnicity. This notwithstanding, around 10 million people are stateless.

In the contemporary era, the concept of full citizenship encompasses not only active political rights, but full civil rights and social rights. Nationality is a necessary but not sufficient condition to exercise full political rights within a state or other polity. Nationality is required for full citizenship.

Historically, the most significant difference between a national and a citizen is that the citizen has the right to vote for elected officials, and the right to be elected. This distinction between full citizenship and other, lesser relationships goes back to antiquity. Until the 19th and 20th centuries, it was typical for only a certain percentage of people who belonged to the state to be considered as full citizens. In the past, a number of people were excluded from citizenship on the basis of sex, socioeconomic class, ethnicity, religion, and other factors. However, they held a legal relationship with their government akin to the modern concept of nationality.

Nationality in context 
United States nationality law defines some persons born in some of the US outlying possessions as US nationals but not citizens. British nationality law defines six classes of British national, among which "British citizen" is one class (having the right of abode in the United Kingdom, along with some "British subjects"). Similarly, in the Republic of China, commonly known as Taiwan, the status of national without household registration applies to people who have the Republic of China nationality, but do not have an automatic entitlement to enter or reside in the Taiwan Area, and do not qualify for civic rights and duties there. Under the nationality laws of Mexico, Colombia, and some other Latin American countries, nationals do not become citizens until they turn the age of majority.

List of nationalities which do not have full citizenship rights

Even if the nationality law classifies people with the same nationality on paper (de jure), the right conferred can be different according to the place of birth or residence, creating different de facto classes of nationality, sometimes with different passports as well. For example, although Chinese nationality law operates uniformly in China, including Hong Kong and Macau SARs, with all Chinese nationals classified the same under the nationality law, in reality local laws, in mainland and also in the SARs, govern the right of Chinese nationals in their respective territories which give vastly different rights, including different passports, to Chinese nationals according to their birthplace or residence place, effectively making a distinction between Chinese national of mainland China, Hong Kong or Macau, both domestically and internationally. The United Kingdom had a similar distinction as well before 1983, where all nationals with a connection to the UK or one of the colonies, were classified as Citizens of the United Kingdom and Colonies, but their rights where different depending on the connection under different laws, which was formalised into different classes of nationalities under the British Nationality Act 1981.

Nationality versus ethnicity 

Nationality is sometimes used simply as an alternative word for ethnicity or national origin, just as some people assume that citizenship and nationality are identical. In some countries, the cognate word for nationality in local language may be understood as a synonym of ethnicity or as an identifier of cultural and family-based self-determination, rather than on relations with a state or current government. For example, some Kurds say that they have Kurdish nationality, even though there is no Kurdish sovereign state at this time in history.

In the context of former Soviet Union and former Socialist Federal Republic of Yugoslavia, "nationality" is often used as translation of the Russian nacional'nost'  and Serbo-Croatian narodnost, which were the terms used in those countries for ethnic groups and local affiliations within the member states of the federation. In the Soviet Union, more than 100 such groups were formally recognized. Membership in these groups was identified on Soviet internal passports, and recorded in censuses in both the USSR and Yugoslavia. In the early years of the Soviet Union's existence, ethnicity was usually determined by the person's native language, and sometimes through religion or cultural factors, such as clothing. Children born after the revolution were categorized according to their parents' recorded ethnicities. Many of these ethnic groups are still recognized by modern Russia and other countries.

Similarly, the term nationalities of China refers to ethnic and cultural groups in China. Spain is one nation, made up of nationalities, which are not politically recognized as nations (state), but can be considered smaller nations within the Spanish nation. Spanish law recognizes the autonomous communities of Andalusia, Aragon, Balearic Islands, Canary Islands, Catalonia, Valencia, Galicia and the Basque Country as "nationalities" (nacionalidades).

In 2013, the Supreme Court of Israel unanimously affirmed the position that "citizenship" (e.g. Israeli) is separate from le'om ("nationality" or "ethnic affiliation"; e.g. Jewish, Arab, Druze, Circassian), and that the existence of a unique "Israeli" le'om has not been proven. Israel recognizes more than 130 le'umim in total.

Nationality versus national identity 
National identity is person's subjective sense of belonging to one state or to one nation. A person may be a national of a state, in the sense of being its citizen, without subjectively or emotionally feeling a part of that state, for example, many migrants in Europe often identify with their ancestral and/or religious background rather than with the state of which they are citizens. Conversely, a person may feel that he belongs to one state without having any legal relationship to it. For example, children who were brought to the US illegally when quite young and grew up there while having little contact with their native country and their culture often have a national identity of feeling American, despite legally being nationals of a different country.

Dual nationality 
Dual nationality is when a single person has a formal relationship with two separate, sovereign states. This might occur, for example, if a person's parents are nationals of separate countries, and the mother's country claims all offspring of the mother's as their own nationals, but the father's country claims all offspring of the father's.

Nationality, with its historical origins in allegiance to a sovereign monarch, was seen originally as a permanent, inherent, unchangeable condition, and later, when a change of allegiance was permitted, as a strictly exclusive relationship, so that becoming a national of one state required rejecting the previous state.

Dual nationality was considered a problem that caused a conflict between states and sometimes imposed mutually exclusive requirements on affected people, such as simultaneously serving in two countries' military forces. Through the middle of the 20th century, many international agreements were focused on reducing the possibility of dual nationality. Since then, many accords recognizing and regulating dual nationality have been formed.

Statelessness 
Statelessness is the condition in which an individual has no formal or protective relationship with any state. There are various reasons why a person can become stateless. This might occur, for example, if a person's parents are nationals of separate countries, and the mother's country rejects all offspring of mothers married to foreign fathers, but the father's country rejects all offspring born to foreign mothers. People in this situation may not legally be the national of any state despite possession of an emotional national identity.

Another stateless situation arises when a person holds a travel document (passport) which recognizes the bearer as having the nationality of a "state" which is not internationally recognized, has no entry into the International Organization for Standardization's country list, is not a member of the United Nations, etc. In the current era, persons native to Taiwan who hold passports of Republic of China are one example.

Some countries (like Kuwait, the UAE, and Saudi Arabia) can also remove one's citizenship; the reasons for removal can be fraud and/or security issues. There are also people who are abandoned at birth and the parents' whereabouts are not known.

De jure vs de facto statelessness 
Nationality law defines citizenship and statelessness. Citizenship is awarded based on two well-known principles: jus sanguinis and jus soli. Jus sanguinis translated from Latin means "right of blood". According to this principle, citizenship is awarded if the parent(s) of the person are citizens of that country. Jus soli is referred to as "birthright citizenship". It means, anyone born in the territory of the country is awarded citizenship of that country.

Statelessness is defined by the 1954 Statelessness Convention as "a person who is not considered a national by any State under operation of its law.” A person can become stateless because of administrative reasons. For example, "A person may be at risk of statelessness if she is born in a State that applies jus sanguinis while her parents were born in a State that applies jus soli, leaving the person ineligible for citizenship in both States due to conflicting laws." Moreover, there are countries in which if a person does not reside for a specified period of time, they can automatically lose their nationality. To protect those individuals from being deemed "stateless", 1961 Statelessness Convention places limitations on nationality laws. See 1961 Statelessness Convention, arts. 6–8.

Conferment of nationality 
	
The following list includes states in which parents are able to confer nationality on their children or spouses.

Africa

Americas

North America

Caribbean

Central America

South America

Asia

Europe

Oceania

See also 
 Blood quantum laws
 Demonym
 Imagined communities
 Intersectionality
 jus sanguinis
 jus soli
 List of adjectival and demonymic forms for countries and nations
 Nottebohm (Liechtenstein v. Guatemala), a 1955 case that is cited for its definitions of nationality
 Second-class citizen
 People
 Volk

Notes

References

Further reading 
 White, Philip L. (2006). What is a nationality?, based on "Globalization and the Mythology of the Nation State," in A.G.Hopkins, ed. Global History: Interactions Between the Universal and the Local Palgrave Macmillan, pp. 257–284
 Grossman, Andrew. Gender and National Inclusion
 Lord Acton, Nationality (1862)

 
Conflict of laws
Human migration
Rights